The GR 36 is a long-distance walking route of the Grande Randonnée network in France. The route connects Ouistreham, on the Normandy coast of the English Channel, with Bourg-Madame, on the Pyrenees border with Spain.

Along the way, the route passes through:
 Ouistreham
 Caen
 Le Mans
 Saumur
 Thouars
 Parthenay
 Niort
 Angoulême
 Périgueux
 Cahors
 Albi
 Carcassonne
 Bourg-Madame

References

External links
 GR36 From Ouistreham (Calvados) to Putanges-Pont-Ecrepin (Orne)
 GR36 From Putanges-Pont-Ecrepin (Orne) to Mont-Saint-Jean (Sarthe)
 GR36 From Mont-Saint-Jean to St Mars-d'Outille (Sarthe)
 GR36 From St Mars-d'Outille (Sarthe) to Brain-sur-Allonnes (Maine-et-Loire)
 GR36 From Brain-sur-Allonnes (Maine-et-Loire) to Gourge (Deux-Sevres)
 GR36 From Gourge to Chize (Deux-Sevres)
 GR36 From Chize (Deux-Sevres) to La Rochefoucauld (Charente)
 GR36 From La Rochefoucauld (Charente) to Bourdeilles (Dordogne)
 GR36 From Bourdeilles to Les Eyzies-de-Tayac-Sireuil (Dordogne)
 GR36 From Les Eyzies-de-Tayac-Sireuil (Dordogne) to Prayssac (Lot)
 GR36 From Prayssac (Lot) to Savignac (Aveyron)
 GR36 From Savignac (Aveyron) to Marsal (Tarn)
 GR36 From Marsal to Cambounes (Tarn)
 GR36 From Cambounes (Tarn) to Ribaute (Aude)
 GR36 From Ribaute (Aude) to Sournia (Pyrenees-Orientales)
 GR36 From Sournia to Bourg-Madame (Pyrenees-Orientales)

Hiking trails in France